Laurent Mauvignier (born in 1967, Tours) is a French writer.

Biography 
After studying visual arts at the École des Beaux-Arts in Paris, Laurent Mauvignier decided to become a writer in the 1990s following the advice of Tanguy Viel, a friend and novelist. To date, he published all his works at the éditions de Minuit, where along with Jean Echenoz, Jean-Philippe Toussaint, Marie NDiaye or Éric Chevillard, Laurent Mauvignier is associated with the so-called « Style [des éditions de] Minuit ».

Works

Novels 
Loin d'eux, éditions de Minuit, 1999,  – Prix Fénéon 2000
Apprendre à finir, éditions de Minuit, 2000,  – Prix Wepler 2001; Inter Book Prize 2001
Ceux d'à côté, éditions de Minuit, 2002, 
Plus sale, Inventaire-invention, 2002, 
Seuls, éditions de Minuit, 2004, 
Le Lien, éditions de Minuit, 2005, 
Dans la foule, éditions de Minuit, 2006,  – Prix du roman Fnac 2006
Des hommes, éditions de Minuit, 2009,  – Prix Virilo 2009; Prix des libraires 2010
Un jour dans la vie, édité par la librairie Passages, 2010, 
Ce que j'appelle oubli, éditions de Minuit, 2011, 
Autour du monde, éditions de Minuit, 2014,  – Prix Amerigo-Vespucci 2014
Retour à Berratham, éditions de Minuit, 2015, 
Histoires de la nuit, éditions  de Minuit, 2020 

Translated works: 
”The Birthday Party” [“La fete d’anniversaire”], editions de Minuit, 2023  504 pages. 

In the Crowd [Dans la foule], Faber and Faber, 2008, .
The Wound [Des hommes], University of Nebraska Press, 2015, .
 Ελληνική μετάφραση:(Greek Translation) Αυτό που εγώ ονομάζω λήθη, μετάφρ. Σπύρος Γιανναράς, εκδ. «`Αγρα», Αθήνα 2014, 75 σελ., ISBN 978-960-505-141-9

Play 
 Tout mon amour, éditions de Minuit, 2012, .

Participation 
2021: La Légende de Thierry Mauvignier, directed by Dylan Besseau

Literary prizes 
2000: Prix Fénéon 
2001: Prix Wepler
2001: Prix du Livre Inter
2006: Prix du roman Fnac
2010: Prix des libraires
2014: Prix Amerigo-Vespucci

References

External links
Mauvignier's official website (in French)

21st-century French novelists
21st-century French dramatists and playwrights
Prix Fénéon winners
Prix du Livre Inter winners
Prix du premier roman winners
Chevaliers of the Ordre des Arts et des Lettres
1967 births
Writers from Tours, France
Living people
Prix des libraires winners